Frank Vernon Ramsey Jr. (July 13, 1931 – July 8, 2018) was an American professional basketball player and coach. A 6-3 forward/guard, he played his entire nine-year (1954–1964) NBA career with the Boston Celtics and played a major role in the early part of their dynasty, winning seven championships as part of the team. Ramsey was also a head coach for the Kentucky Colonels of the ABA during the 1970–1971 season. Ramsey was inducted into the Naismith Basketball Hall of Fame in 1982.

University of Kentucky
Raised in Madisonville, Kentucky, Ramsey was a multi-sport athlete at the University of Kentucky, playing baseball as well as basketball. Playing under legendary coach Adolph Rupp, Ramsey, as a sophomore in 1951, helped the Wildcats win the NCAA Championship with a 68–58 victory over Kansas State.

In the fall of 1952, a point shaving scandal involving three Kentucky players (a fourth player, Bill Spivey, a teammate of Ramsey's on the 1951 championship team, was accused of being involved in the scandal but denied the charge) over a four-year period forced Kentucky to forfeit its upcoming season, Ramsey's senior year, as well as that of Cliff Hagan and Lou Tsioropoulos. The suspension of the season made Kentucky's basketball team, in effect, the first college sports team to get the "death penalty," although it was nothing more than the NCAA asking members schools not to schedule Kentucky, and not mandating it.

Ramsey, Hagan and Tsioropoulos all graduated from Kentucky in 1953 and, as a result, became eligible for the NBA draft. All three players were selected by the Boston Celtics—Ramsey in the first round, Hagan in the third, and Tsioropoulos in the seventh. All three also returned to Kentucky for one more season despite graduating. After finishing the regular season (one in which Ramsey averaged 19.6 points per game) with a perfect 25–0 record and a #1 ranking in the Associated Press, Kentucky had been offered a bid into the NCAA Tournament. However, then-existing NCAA rules prohibited graduate students from participating in post-season play; the Wildcats declined the bid because their participation would have forced them to play without Ramsey, Hagan and Tsioropoulos, thus jeopardizing their perfect season.

Ramsey also played on Kentucky Wildcats baseball team, earning All-SEC honors as an outfielder in 1951, 1952 and 1954.

Upon completion of his college basketball career, Ramsey scored 1344 points (14.8 ppg), which at the time ranked him fourth in the school's history, and grabbed 1038 rebounds (11.4 rpg), a school record later surpassed by one of his future Kentucky Colonels players, Dan Issel.

Boston Celtics
After playing his rookie season with the Celtics (1954–1955), Ramsey spent one year in the military before rejoining the team. In the eight seasons he played after military service, he was a member of seven championship teams (1957, 1959–1964).  He was a major contributor of the Celtics dynasty, playing behind the duo of Bob Cousy and Bill Sharman and playing with Bill Russell, Sam Jones, K. C. Jones, Tom Heinsohn, John Havlicek and Satch Sanders. In his 623 NBA games Ramsey scored 8378 points for an average of 13.4 points per game. He was inducted into the Naismith Memorial Basketball Hall of Fame in 1981. His #23 is retired by the Celtics.

Ramsey's best statistical season was 1957–1958; he averaged 16.5 points and 7.3 rebounds per game. It was also his only post-military season in which the Celtics did not win the NBA championship; the Bob Pettit-led St. Louis Hawks (who also featured Cliff Hagan, Ramsey's ex-college teammate) defeated them in the NBA Finals.

Brief coaching career
Ramsey was also a head coach for one season (1970–71) in the ABA with the Kentucky Colonels, who were led by two former Kentucky Wildcats – Issel, a rookie, and Louie Dampier. Ramsey was named coach 17 games into an 84-game season (which began with Gene Rhodes coaching the first 15 games and fellow Kentucky alum Alex Groza coaching the next two) and, though he had a 32–35 record, coached the Colonels into the playoffs. The Colonels lost to the Utah Stars (who were coached by Sharman, Ramsey's ex-Celtic teammate) in the 1971 ABA Finals, 4 games to 3. Joe Mullaney replaced Ramsey as coach the following season.

Prior to coaching in the ABA, Ramsey had been Red Auerbach's first choice to replace his mentor as Celtics coach after Auerbach retired at the end of the 1965–66 season. However, Ramsey decided to move back to Madisonville; his father, Frank Sr., wasn't in good health and Frank Jr. had three children to raise.

The NBA's first sixth man
Auerbach is often credited throughout basketball with creating the sixth man. Though Ramsey was one of the Celtics' best players, he felt more comfortable coming off the bench and Auerbach wanted him fresh and in the lineup at the end of close games. Ramsey was the first in a series of sixth men who won championship rings with the Celtics. In the championships the Celtics won after Ramsey's retirement, they have had successful sixth men such as Havlicek, Paul Silas, Kevin McHale, Bill Walton, and James Posey.

Ramsey was mentioned in the episode "If I Could See Me Now" of Married... with Children. Bud asked Al the trivia question, "Who was known as the best sixth man in basketball? He played for the Celtics", to which Al nonchalantly replied, "Frank Ramsey".

Personal life
On November 15, 2005, Ramsey's house was destroyed in a tornado that hit his residence in Madisonville. One of his plaques was found miles away from his home, and Ramsey himself was found unhurt.

, Ramsey was a bank president in Dixon, Kentucky.

Ramsey died of natural causes in his hometown of Madisonville, Kentucky on July 8, 2018, at the age of 86.

Honors

 Ramsey was inducted into the Naismith Basketball Hall of Fame in 1982.
 In 2005, Ramsey was inducted into the University of Kentucky Athletics Hall of Fame.
 In 2006, Ramsey was a charter inductee to the College Basketball Hall of Fame.
 Ramsey's #23 jersey is retired by the Boston Celtics.
 Ramsey's #30 jersey is retired by the University of Kentucky Wildcats.

NBA career statistics

Regular season

Playoffs

References

External links

 Frank Ramsey's bio on Hoophall.com
Frank Ramsey's University of Kentucky page

1931 births
2018 deaths
All-American college men's basketball players
American men's basketball players
Basketball coaches from Kentucky
Basketball players from Kentucky
Boston Celtics draft picks
Boston Celtics players
Kentucky Colonels coaches
Kentucky Wildcats baseball players
Kentucky Wildcats men's basketball players
Naismith Memorial Basketball Hall of Fame inductees
National Basketball Association players with retired numbers
National Collegiate Basketball Hall of Fame inductees
People from Henderson County, Kentucky
People from Madisonville, Kentucky
Shooting guards
Small forwards